A number of units of measurement were used in Haiti to measure length, area, volume, etc.  Since 1921, Metric system has been compulsory in Haiti.

Units before the metric system

Older units before the Metric system were British, old French, and Spanish.

Length

Several units were used in Haiti.  One toise was 1.9488 m and one anne was 1.188 m, according to the legal equivalents during the transition period to metric system.

Area

One carreau was equal to 1292.3 square meters according to the legal equivalents during the transition period to metric system.

Volume

Several units were used to measure volume.  Some units and their equivalents according to the transition period, are given below:

1 baril = 0.1 m3

1 corde = 3.84 m3

1 toise = 8 m3.

References

Haitian culture
Haiti